"The Revenant Choir" is Versailles first single and was released in three different versions, each with a different cover. It was initially sold at their "boys only" concert on June 23, 2007, at Meguro Rokumeikan. It was sold again at a "female only" live on July 25, at Holiday Shinjuku. A third CD version was issued through Shoxx magazine mail order in September 2007. This version is an enhanced CD that comes with a digital photo gallery.

A DVD under the same title was sold at a concert at the Ebisu Liquid Room on June 24. This only included the music video for the track, no CD.

Track listing

Personnel 
 Piano – Kazami (DaizyStripper)
 Choir – The Revenant Choir
 English Narration – Leah Riegle

References 

Versailles (band) songs
2007 singles
2007 songs
Songs written by Kamijo (musician)